The Western Collegiate Athletic Association (WCAA) was a women's-only athletic conference on the West Coast of the United States.

Members competed in the Association for Intercollegiate Athletics for Women (AIAW) until the 1981–82 academic year, then the National Collegiate Athletic Association (NCAA). For its final year in 1985–86, the league was renamed Pacific West Conference; the Pac-10 Conference added women's sports in 1986 and the WCAA was retired.

Membership
 Arizona Wildcats
 Arizona State Sun Devils
 Cal State Fullerton Titans
 Long Beach State 49ers
 San Diego State Aztecs
 Stanford Cardinal
 UCLA Bruins
 USC Trojans

History
The WCAA was founded in 1976 with seven charter members: UCLA, USC, Arizona, Arizona State, Cal State-Fullerton, Long Beach State, and San Diego State. These seven were among the premier programs in many women's sports and were previously independent. The men's teams at these schools competed in three leagues: Pacific-8, WAC, and PCAA. The seven WCAA schools represented the entirety of Division I football schools in southern California and Arizona. The NCAA began sponsoring women's championships in the summer of 1981, and the WCAA moved from the AIAW to the NCAA.

Stanford joined in 1982, and the WCAA had eight members for three years; the PCAA added women's sports in 1985, so Long Beach State and Cal State-Fullerton moved. San Diego State also joined the PCAA for women's sports only (the WAC did not sponsor women's sports until 1990; its parallel league was the "High Country Athletic Conference").

The remaining five members of the WCAA, all Pac-10 schools, competed in the renamed "PacWest Conference" for a final academic year (1985–86); the Pac-10 added women's sports in the summer of 1986. Its other five schools (Washington, Washington State, Oregon, Oregon State, and California) had been members of the Northern Pacific Conference, which was also retired.

Similarly in the west, the Mountain West Athletic Conference (MWAC) was the women's league for the Big Sky Conference until 1988.

AIAW and DGWS National Champions

Badminton
Long Beach State: 1970, 74
Arizona State: 1971, 75, 76, 78, 79, 80, 81
UCLA: 1977

Basketball
Cal State-Fullerton: 1970
UCLA: 1978

Bowling
Arizona State: 1981

Fencing
Cal State-Fullerton: 1974

Field Hockey
Long Beach State: 1978

Golf
Cal State-Fullerton: 1967 (Individual)
Arizona State: 1969 (Individual), 70 (Individual), 75 (Team)
San Diego State: 1975 (Individual)

Gymnastics
Cal State-Fullerton: 1979

Softball
Arizona State: 1972, 73
UCLA: 1978

Swimming & Diving
Arizona State: 1968, 69, 70, 71, 73, 74, 77, 78

Synchronized Swimming
Arizona: 1980, 81

Tennis
Arizona State: 1971, 72, 74
USC: 1977, 79, 80
UCLA: 1981

Outdoor Track & Field
UCLA: 1975, 77

Volleyball
UCLA: 1971, 74, 75
Long Beach State: 1972, 73
USC: 1976, 77, 80

NCAA National Champions
USC Basketball: 1983, 84
UCLA Outdoor Track & Field: 1982, 83
UCLA Softball: 1982, 84, 85
Cal State-Fullerton softball: 1986
Stanford Swimming & Diving: 1983
Stanford tennis: 1982, 84, 86, 87
USC tennis: 1983, 85
USC volleyball: 1981
UCLA volleyball: 1984

References